Euxesta annonae is a species of ulidiid or picture-winged fly in the genus Euxesta of the family Ulidiidae. The species can be found from Orlando, Florida to Hawaii, where it feeds on corn.

References

annonae
Insects described in 1794
Taxa named by Johan Christian Fabricius